Llandrindod Wells Football Club are an association football club based in the town of Llandrindod Wells, Powys, Wales.  The club plays in the Ardal Leagues North East, tier 3 of the Welsh football pyramid.

History
Llandrindod Wells were formed in November 1883.

On 24 April 2010, Llandrindod won the Emrys Morgan Cup by beating Montgomery 1–0.

After enjoying a good 2010–11 season, the first team finished runners up in the Mid Wales League South, ending a point behind Builth Wells and were promoted to the Mid Wales Football League Division Two, at the time a newly created league.

For the 2011–12 season saw Llandrindod placed fourth behind winners Aberaeron, with second placed Four Crosses also promoted to the Division One. Llanfair United placed 3rd. The season ended with cup success, defeating Hay St Marys to win the Radnorshire cup at Builth Wells

In the 2012–13 season, Llandrindod firsts played their second season in Division Two. After a very good start, going undefeated in the first 10 games, the side fell away after Christmas but finished the season as runners up to winners Llanfair United. Both clubs were promoted to DDivision One for the 2013–14 season.

In the season 2013–14 the Llandrindod First team won a staggering 16 games out of 16 in their inaugural season in Division One This included an opening day 8–1 away win at local rivals Builth Wells and a further win away at Montgomery 13–0. The team went on to maintain their form enough over the season to win Division One at their first attempt. The team remained undefeated at home in the league, only dropping 2 points. The season culminated in a must win last day victory over Montgomery Town. The 3–1 scoreline secured the league and in the process took the team to 101 goals in just 28 games, whilst also conceding the fewest goals. Remarkably, the runners up were fellow promoted club Llanfair United. Over the season, some 20 players featured in the team. Injuries and absences took their toll after Christmas but the whole squad and strength in depth ensured that the team deservedly triumphed and won the league for the first time in 47 years. Of the whole squad, at least 15 players had played at junior and youth level for the club.

After ground improvements in the new year of 2014, the club met the ground criteria for the 2014–15 season to return to the Cymru Alliance, the second tier of Welsh Club Football. The reserve team will again compete in the Mid Wales League South for the 2014–15 season.

Honours

Mid Wales Football League Division One – Champions: 1961-62, 1966-67, 2013–14
Mid Wales Football League Division One – Runners-up: 1962-63, 1964-65, 1993-94,2019–20
Mid Wales Football League Division Two – Runners-up: 2012–13
Mid Wales South League – Runners-up: 1964-65, 1997-98, 2010–11
J. Emrys Morgan Cup Winners: 2009–10
Radnorshire Cup – Winners: 1962–63, 1999–2000, 2010–11, 2016–17
Radnorshire Cup – Finalists: 1974–75, 1991–92, 2014–15

International players
Players selected to play for Wales:
Carl Robinson  1999–2009 52 caps

References

Football clubs in Wales
Sport in Powys
Mid Wales Football League clubs
1883 establishments in Wales
Cymru Alliance clubs
Association football clubs established in 1883
Ardal Leagues clubs
Llandrindod Wells